Manoba tribei is a moth in the family Nolidae. It was described by Jeremy Daniel Holloway in 2003 and is found in Borneo.

References

Moths described in 2003
Nolinae